Deh-e Heydar or Deh Heydar or Deh Heidar may refer to:
 Deh-e Heydar, Hamadan
 Deh Heydar, Isfahan
 Deh Heydar, Kerman